This is a list of recently extinct flora of Australia, that is plants that are considered to have become extinct since the European colonisation of Australia in 1788. Within Australia there are mechanisms for registering an extinction at the federal, state and territory levels. Federal and state listings may vary due to regional extinctions or because of differing definitions of extinction in the various pieces of legislation.

Plants listed as extinct by the federal government
Plants and animals are listed as extinct and the federal level under the auspices of the Environment Protection and Biodiversity Conservation Act 1999. The Act lists all plants considered to have become extinct since the commencement of European settlement of Australia in 1788. There are 37 species currently listed as extinct under the Act.

Of note, the species Pimelea spinescens subsp. pubiflora was presumed extinct after 1901, but a population was discovered in 2005. The orchid Diuris bracteata was also considered extinct after its first collection in 1899, but it was thought to have been rediscovered in 1998. The later collections are now considered to be Diuris platichila. The spiny everlasting (Acanthocladium dockeri) was reclassified as critically endangered in 2006 after it was rediscovered in 1999. Bennett's Seaweed, declared extinct under the EPBC Act in 1999; was the first protist listed as extinct by the IUCN in 2004.

Plants listed as extinct by the states and territories

Each state and territory of Australia has legislation to record the extinction of plants and animals; organisms listed as extinct at the state level may differ from those listed under the EPBC Act.

Australian Capital Territory
Threatened species are listed under the Nature Conservation Act 2014 in the Australian Capital Territory.

New South Wales
There are 35 taxa "presumed extinct" as specified in Part 4 of Schedule 1 of the New South Wales Threatened Species Conservation Act 1995. Species presumed extinct in New South Wales, but not listed under the EPBC Act include:

Rhaphidospora bonneyana, Glinus orygioides, Ptilotus extenuatus, Acanthocladium dockeri (listed by EPBC as extinct in SA, but not NSW), Blumea lacera, Senecio behrianus, Stemmacantha australis, Lepidium foliosum, Stenopetalum velutinum, Atriplex acutiloba, Maireana lanosa, Osteocarpum pentapterum, Hypolepis elegans, Codonocarpus pyramidalis,  Haloragis stricta, Myriophyllum implicatum, Caladenia rosella, Thelymitra epipactoides, Comesperma scoparium, Grevillea nematophylla, Persoonia laxa, Pomaderris oraria, Aphanes pentamera, Knoxia sumatrensis, Micromelum minutum, Philotheca angustifolia, Dodonaea stenophylla, Tetratheca pilosa subsp. pilosa.

Although listed as extinct under the EPBC Act, Diurus bracteata is listed as endangered in New South Wales.

Northern Territory
Threatened species is the Northern Territory are listed under IUCN criteria by the Department of Natural Resources, Environment and the Arts. As of 2006 there are no recorded plant extinctions in the Northern Territory.

South Australia
Threatened species are listed under the National Parks and Wildlife Act 1972 in South Australia. 26 plant taxa are presumed extinct in South Australia, 2 of these are listed under the EPBC Act

Queensland
Threatened species are listed under the Nature Conservation Act 1992 and the Nature Conservation (Wildlife) Regulation 2006 in Queensland, under this act some species are described as "presumed extinct". There are currently 27 species described as presumed extinct in Queensland, those not listed under the EPBC Act include:

Acianthus ledwardii, Amphineuron immersum, Antrophyum austroqueenslandicum, Corchorus thozetii, Dimocarpus leichhardtii, Lindsaea pulchella var. blanda, Oldenlandia tenelliflora var. papuana, Rhaphidospora cavernarum, Tapeinosperma flueckigeri, Teucrium ajugaceum, Trichomanes exiguum, Wendlandia psychotrioides, Zieria sp. (Russell River S.Johnson in 1892).

It was reported on 12 April 2008 that two of the plants, Rhaphidospora cavernarum and Teucrium ajugaceum have been rediscovered on Cape York between Cooktown and Lockhart River, and are now re-classified as "vulnerable".

Tasmania
There are 20 taxa classified as "presumed extinct" under schedule 3.2 of the Tasmanian Threatened Species Protection Act 1995. Only three of these species are listed as extinct under the EPBC Act. The additional species listed as extinct under Tasmanian legislation are:

Ballantinia antipoda, Banksia integrifolia subsp. integrifolia, Botrychium australe, Caladenia cardiochila, Chenopodium erosum, Coopernookia barbata, Hibbertia obtusifolia, Lepilaena australis, Levenhookia dubia, Myriophyllum glomeratum, Podotheca angustifolia, Prostanthera cuneata, Punctelia subflava, Senecio macrocarpus, Thesium australe, Thynninorchis huntiana and Veronica notabilis.

Victoria
Threatened species in Victoria are identified under the auspices of the Flora and Fauna Guarantee Act (1988); the act does not specify species presumed extinct. The Victorian Department of Sustainability and Environment maintain a list of species presumed extinct in Victoria; they list 51 extinct taxa, those not listed under the EPBC Act include:

Acacia argyrophylla, Acacia havilandiorum, Acrotriche depressa, Actinotus bellidioides, Asplenium polyodon, Atriplex billardierei, Austrostipa tuckeri, Caladenia carnea var. subulata, Caladenia magnifica, Caladenia thysanochila, Calotis pubescens, Cardamine gunnii s.s., Centipeda pleiocephala, Cheiranthera alternifolia, Chionogentias gunniana, Convolvulus microsepalus, Cuscuta victoriana, Cyperus vaginatus, Digitaria diffusa, Dodonaea heteromorpha, Epilobium willisii, Euphrasia collina subsp. speciosa, Hibbertia incana s.s., Hypolepis elegans subsp. elegans, Leiocarpa tomentosa, Leionema microphyllum, Lemooria burkittii, Leptorhynchos scaber s.s., Phyllangium sulcatum, Picris barbarorum, Podolepis arachnoidea, Pomaderris obcordata, Prasophyllum colemaniae, Prasophyllum morganii, Prasophyllum sp. aff. odoratum, Prasophyllum suttonii s.s., Pterostylis sp. aff. biseta (Lara), Rutidosis helichrysoides, Senecio murrayanus, Senna form taxon artemisioides, Stemmacantha australis, Stenanthemum notiale subsp. notiale, Trema tomentosa var. viridis, Braithwaitea sulcata.

Western Australia
There are 14 taxa classified as "X: Declared Rare Flora - Presumed Extinct Taxa" under the Department of Environment and Conservation's Declared Rare and Priority Flora List, all of which have been gazetted as presumed extinct flora in Western Australia under the Wildlife Conservation Act 1950. This list coincides with the federal EPBC Act list, except that it includes Leptomeria dielsiana, Ptilotus caespitulosus and Taraxacum cygnorum; and excludes Frankenia conferta (Silky Frankenia) and Calothamnus accedens.

See also
Flora of Australia
List of threatened flora of Australia
List of Australian species extinct in the Holocene

References

Extinct flora of Australia
Extinct flora of Australia
Australia
Australia